8-Track Flashback (also titled VH1's 8-Track Flashback) is a TV series hosted by David Cassidy, Leif Garrett, and Suzanne Somers. This rhyming title refers to the fact that it is a "flashback" to the popularity of 8-tracks in the 1970s. The show aired on VH1 from September 23, 1995 to 1998.

A compilation CD, 8-Track Flashback: One Hit Wonders, was released in the late 1990s highlighting some of the songs featured on the series.

References

External links
8-Track Flashback at the Internet Movie Database

1995 American television series debuts
VH1 original programming
1998 American television series endings